George Henry Emerson (September 24, 1853 – March 6, 1916) was a lawyer, judge and political figure in Newfoundland. He represented Placentia and St. Mary's in the Newfoundland and Labrador House of Assembly from 1885 to 1894 as a Liberal.

He was born in Harbour Grace, Newfoundland and Labrador. Emerson articled in law with his uncle Prescott Emerson and others and was called to the bar in 1877. Emerson was speaker for the Newfoundland assembly from 1889 to 1894 when he was unseated by petition. He served in the Legislative Council from 1895 to 1896, when he resigned his seat after being named to the Supreme Court of Newfoundland and Labrador. He served until his death in St. John's in 1916 at the age of 62.

Emerson was the father of Lewis Edward Emerson who also served in the assembly and became the province's first Chief Justice.

References 
 

Speakers of the Newfoundland and Labrador House of Assembly
Members of the Legislative Council of Newfoundland
1853 births
1916 deaths
Newfoundland Colony judges
People from Harbour Grace